St Bene't's Church is a Church of England parish church in central Cambridge, England. Parts of the church, most notably the tower, are Anglo-Saxon, and it is the oldest church in Cambridgeshire as well as the oldest building in Cambridge.

The church is dedicated to Saint Benedict of Nursia, the founder of the Benedictine order of monasticism. Bene't is an attempt to reconcile the Anglo-Norman name Benet with the Latin (and modern English) form of the saint's name Benedict. Latin documents from the 13th and 14th century refer to "ecclesie sancti Benedicti" while a contract (in English) of 6 June 1452 for a new roof referred to the "cherche of seynt Bennettys". Lyne's map of Cambridge of 1574 shows "Benett Ch" while Loggan's map of 1688 shows "St Bennetts Church". In the 19th century the church was variously referred to as being of "St Benedict", "St Benet" or "St Bene't". Modern usage is either "St Benet" or "St Bene't".

Location
The church is on the south side of Bene't Street next to Corpus Christi College. St Bene't's was the College's chapel until 1579. The College remains the church's patron, and there are continuing links between the church and the College chapel.

History
St Bene't's Anglo-Saxon tower was "most probably" built between AD 1000–1050, although the present bell-openings were added in 1586. The tower has characteristically Anglo-Saxon long-and-short quoins. These project beyond the rubble face, indicating that the tower used to be rendered, as All Saints' Church, Earls Barton is. Inside the church the 11th-century arch supporting the tower is the most notable feature.

The arcade of the nave is from a rebuilding of c.1300, when the aisles were also rebuilt. The 14th-century aisles and the north and east walls of the chancel were razed when the church was widened during two Victorian restorations: in 1853 Raphael Brandon rebuilt the north aisle and added the porch; in 1872 Arthur Blomfield rebuilt the south aisle, the chancel and the clerestory of the nave including the chancel arch. During these works Anglo-Saxon footings of quoins were found which indicated that the original nave was wider than it is today. It is not known when aisles were first added, but it seems likely to have been at a rebuilding before that of c.1300.

In the 13th century the chancel was altered, hence the deeply splayed Early English Gothic lancet windows on the south side (one of which is now blocked). The sedilia and piscina in the chancel are 14th-century, with Decorated Gothic ogeed arches. The clerestory and roof of the nave are late Perpendicular Gothic and date from 1452.

St Bene't's has one monumental brass: a small kneeling figure of Richard Billingford, who died in 1442 and had been Master of Corpus Christi College 1398–1432.

The church is a Grade I listed building.

Bells
From its earliest days until the 17th century, the University paid the church to use its bells. A document of 1273 records that the rector agreed to the bells being rung for the University provided the "customary gratification" was paid. This became an annual sum of six shillings and eight pence which was paid as late as 1624, after the tower of Great St Mary's had been completed. In 1655 the University gave thirty shillings "as a free gift" towards the repair of the bells.

The tower has a ring of six bells, five of which are 16th or 17th century. Oldest is the second bell, cast by an unknown bellfounder in 1588. A local founder, Richard Holdfield of Cambridge, cast the third bell in 1607 and the fifth bell in 1610. John Draper of Thetford cast the tenor bell in 1618 and Robert Gurney of Bury St Edmunds cast the treble bell in 1663. The youngest is the fourth bell, cast by William Dobson of Downham Market in 1825. Dobson was a prolific bellfounder and 233 of his bells are known to survive. Surviving bells by Holdfield, Draper or Gurney are much rarer.

People
Michael Ramsey, who later became Archbishop of Canterbury, was vicar in 1938. Brothers of the Society of Saint Francis (among them Br Michael (Fisher)) served at St Bene't's from 1945 until 2005. The Revd Angela Tilby, a regular contributor to BBC Radio 4's Thought for the Day, was vicar, 2007–11. The Revd Canon Anna Matthews, previously precentor of St Albans Cathedral, served as vicar from September 2012 until her death in March 2023.

Fabian Stedman (1640–1713), a pioneer in the development of change ringing, was clerk of the parish in the mid 17th century.

See also
 Leper Chapel of St Mary Magdalene, dating from 1125
 Holy Sepulchre, Cambridge or Round Church, dating from 1130
 School of Pythagoras, the oldest secular building in Cambridge, dating from about 1200

References

Sources and further reading



11th-century church buildings in England
Church of England church buildings in Cambridge
History of Cambridge
Standing Anglo-Saxon churches
Grade I listed churches in Cambridgeshire
Grade I listed buildings in Cambridge
Chapels of Colleges of the University of Cambridge